Orchard Ridge, Baltimore is a neighborhood in the Northeastern part of Baltimore, Maryland, United States. It was formerly known as Claremont-Freedom. The neighborhood was redeveloped as a mixed tenancy, mixed-income community with 461 units. It includes both rental and homeownership townhouses, semi-detached homes, apartments and a community center.

See also
List of Baltimore neighborhoods

References

External links
Harkins Builder
Pennrose Properties 
Baltimore Housing

Neighborhoods in Baltimore
Northeast Baltimore